The Scottish Album of the Year (SAY) Award is an award given annually for an outstanding album produced by a Scottish artist. The award was launched in 2012 by the Scottish Music Industry Association (SMIA) in partnership with Creative Scotland. The winner receives a £20,000 prize and the nine shortlisted artists receive £1,000.

Process 
Once all eligible albums have been collated, 100 impartial 'Nominators', chosen from sectors including journalism, broadcast and radio, music retail and live music venues, will consider the titles from The SAY Award's Eligible Albums list, nominating their five favourite albums and ranking them in order of preference. 'Nominators' include specialists in a variety of genres, such as jazz, classical, electronic and traditional folk, as well as key influencers from elsewhere in the arts, and cannot have a commercial interest in any of the albums being discussed. The SMIA assigns a score to each title in a Nominator's Top 5, before announcing the 20 highest scoring albums as The SAY Award Longlist.

The Longlist is then whittled down to a Shortlist of 10 albums, one of which will be chosen by music fans via an online public vote and the others decided by The SAY Award judging panel. Previous judges have included the composer Craig Armstrong, Turner Prize winning artists Douglas Gordon and Susan Philipsz, Filmmaker Lynne Ramsey, Music Editor of The Skinny Tallah Brash, DJ and Promoter Sarra Wild, Edinburgh International Festival Director Fergus Linehan, Sub Club Partner/Director Barry Price and Scottish Ballet's Sophie Laplane.

The SAY Award Shortlist is then honoured at an exclusive ceremony, with each title receiving an award created by The SAY Award Design Commission winner and a minimum of £1,000. The SAY Award judging panel reconvene for the ceremony and decide who picks up the £20,000 first prize and coveted title of Scottish Album of the Year.

Past winners

External links
http://www.sayaward.com/

References

British music awards
Annual events in the United Kingdom
Scottish awards
2012 establishments in Scotland
Awards established in 2012
Album awards